Bucket is a cylindrical or conical open-top container for transporting liquid or granular material.

Bucket may also refer to:

People with the name
Charles Goldenberg (1911–1986), American All-Pro National Football League player nicknamed "Buckets"
Robert "Bucket" Hingley (born 1955), lead singer of ska band The Toasters
Stewart Loewe (born 1968), former Australian rules footballer nicknamed "Buckets"

Arts, entertainment, and media

Fictional entities
Charlie Bucket, the title character in the Roald Dahl novels Charlie and the Chocolate Factory and Charlie and the Great Glass Elevator
 Kirby Buckets, the title character of Kirby Buckets, a television series that began airing in 2014
The Buckets, a fictional family from the British comedy Keeping Up Appearances
Hyacinth Bucket, the main character in the show

Music
 Bucket!, an album by American jazz organist Jimmy Smith released in 1966
 "Bucket" (song), a 2008 song by Carly Rae Jepsen
 "Bucket", a 2012 single by Annah Mac
 "The Bucket", the first single taken from the Kings of Leon album Aha Shake Heartbreak

Other uses in arts, entertainment, and media
Bucket (TV series), a 2017 BBC4 comedy drama starring Miriam Margolyes and Frog Stone
The Buckets, a comic strip syndicated in 1990

Other uses
 Bucket mute, a mute for brass instruments
 Bucket seat, a seat contoured to hold one person
 War of the Bucket, fought by the city-states of Bologna and Modena in northern Italy in 1325
 Alternative name for Gravity bong, a smoking device
 Bucket (machine part), the scoop installed on different machines

See also
Buckethead (born 1969), sometimes referred to as Bucket for short, stage name of musician Brian Patrick Carroll